Klein High School is a public high school located in Klein, Texas, United States, located approximately  from Downtown Houston. It serves grades 9–12 in the Klein Independent School District. The current principal of Klein High School is Brandon Baker.

History
In July 1928, five common school districts in the area were consolidated into Rural High School District Number One. The new high school was formed from French School, Hildebrandt School, Oak Grove School, and Willow Creek School. Kohrville School, a school for black children, also consolidated into the district.

The new district's high school building was located at what is now 7200 Spring-Cypress Road, between Kuykendahl Road and Stuebner Airline Road. This building is now behind the district's central office building. In 1938, Rural High School District Number One became Klein Independent School District, and its high school became Klein High School.
 The high school moved to its current location in 1963.

The old main building of Klein High School was demolished in 2010 to make way for construction of a completely new facility that has now replaced all existing buildings.  All construction was completed by December 2014.  Plans for the new campus are online (see reference).

In 2017, areas of the Klein Collins High School zone west of Kuykendahl Road were rezoned to Klein High, and areas of the Klein Forest High School zone between Cypress Creek and Farm to Market Road 1960 were rezoned to Klein High.

Profile
Klein was the first high school established in the Klein Independent School District. It is accredited by the Texas Education Agency and the Southern Association of Colleges and Schools. 93% of the 2006 graduating class planned on attending college, receiving over $7 million in college scholarships.

In the 2020-21 school year, there were 3,190 students. 17.6% were African American, 11.1% were Asian, 31.3% were Hispanic, 0.4% were American Indian, 0.1% were Pacific Islander, 34.7% were White, and 4.8% were two or more races. 40.1% of students were Economically Disadvantaged, 6.7% were English Language Learners, and 8.9% received Special Education services.

Academics
For the 2021-22 school year, the school received a B grade from the Texas Education Agency, with an overall score of 89 out of 100. The school received a B grade in two domains, School Progress (score of 85) and Closing the Gaps (score of 88), and an A grade in Student Achievement (score of 90). The school received four of the seven possible distinction designations: Academic Achievement in Mathematics, Academic Achievement in Science, Top 25% Comparative Academic Growth, and Top 25% Comparative Closing the Gaps.

Sports and other activities
Klein High School competes in UIL Region II District 15 along with Klein Oak, Klein Collins, Klein Forest, and Klein Cain.

State championships
 Boys Soccer: 1997, 1999, 2005
 Baseball: 1998
 Tennis: 1982-83, 1989–90
 Chess Team: 2002

Cheerleading
The Klein High School cheerleaders Nationals Team earned a national championship at the 2006 NCA Senior and Junior High School National Championships in the Medium Varsity division, and also won a specialty award for Best Use of Jumps in the routine. The 2007 NCA National Championship was preceded by a regional title at the Texas Lone Star Classic and a state championship at the Texas State Championships for Division 5A schools. The cheerleading team has earned six national titles at the NCA competition in the last 19 years including Grand Champions in 2000.

Music
The Klein High School full orchestra was named the Texas Music Educators Association (TMEA) honor orchestra for 2007–08, the fourth time that the full orchestra was honored. It won similar honors in 1998, 2001, and 2003. In 2016–17, the school was chosen as the string honor orchestra.

The Wind Symphony was one of five National Wind Band winner in 2008 in Class AAAAA.

Debate
In 2010, a Klein junior varsity team finished first at the Harvard National Debate Tournament.

Notable alumni

References

External links

 

Klein Independent School District high schools
1938 establishments in Texas
Educational institutions established in 1938